Bhanu Athaiya (née Rajopadhye; 28 April 192915 October 2020) was an Indian costume designer and painter. She was the first Indian to win an Academy Award.  Alongside being Bollywood's most iconic costume designer, she had a historically important early career as an artist with contemporaries like M. F. Husain, F. N. Souza and Vasudeo S. Gaitonde. She was the only woman member of the Bombay Progressive Artists' Group. Two of Bhanu Rajopadhye's artworks were included in the 1953 Progressive Artists' Group show in Bombay.

After her switch from art to cinema, Bhanu went on to become one of the leading creators of the aesthetic of a young India through her work on costumes for Bollywood films. She worked on over 100 films, with Indian filmmakers such as Guru Dutt, Yash Chopra, B.R. Chopra, Raj Kapoor, Vijay Anand, Raj Khosla, and Ashutosh Gowariker, notably in films like C.I.D. (1956), Pyaasa (1957), Sahib Bibi Aur Ghulam (1962), Guide (1965), Amrapali (1966), Teesri Manzil (1966), Satyam Shivam Sundaram (1979), Razia Sultan (1983), Chandni (1989), Lekin... (1990), 1942: A Love Story (1993), Lagaan (2001), and Swades (2004). She also worked on international projects with directors such Conrad Rooks in Siddhartha (1972) and Richard Attenborough in Gandhi (1982).

For Gandhi, Bhanu won the Academy Award for Best Costume Design and was nominated for a BAFTA Award for Best Costume Design.

Early life and background
Athaiya was born in a brahmin family Kolhapur in Maharashtra of British India. She was the third of seven children born to Annasaheb and Shantabai Rajopadhye. Athaiya's father, Annasaheb was a self-taught artist and photographer who worked in the films of Baburao Painter. He died when Athaiya was 11 years old.

She studied at Sir J J School of Art, Mumbai, where she won the Usha Deshmukh Gold medal in 1951 for the artwork titled 'Lady In Repose'.

Career
Bhanu started her career as an artist in Mumbai while still studying at JJ School of Art. Later she became a member of the Progressive Artists' Group and exhibited with them. She continued her part-time stint as a freelance fashion illustrator for women's magazine like "Eve's Weekly" and "Fashion & Beauty". while at the JJ School of Art. Later when the Eve's Weekly editor opened a boutique, she asked Athaiya to try designing dresses, hereupon she discovered her flair for designing clothes. Her success as a designer soon led to her switching career paths. Her costume designing career began by designing clothes for Guru Dutt's films, starting with C.I.D. (1956). She soon became a part of the Guru Dutt team.

She made her debut as a film costume designer with the film C.I.D. in 1956, and followed it up with other Guru Dutt films such as Pyaasa (1957), Chaudhvin Ka Chand (1960) and Sahib Bibi Aur Ghulam (1962). In her career spanning 50 years she has received numerous awards. She won the Academy Award for Best Costume Design (shared with John Mollo) for her work in the 1982 film, Gandhi and became the first Indian to win an Academy Award. She also won two National Film Awards, in 1991 and 2002.

In a career spanning over 100 films, she worked with Indian filmmakers such as Guru Dutt, Yash Chopra, B.R. Chopra, Raj Kapoor, Vijay Anand, Raj Khosla, and Ashutosh Gowariker, and international directors such Conrad Rooks and Richard Attenborough.

In March 2010, Athaiya released her book The Art of Costume Design, published by HarperCollins. On 13 January 2013, Athaiya presented a copy of the book to the Dalai Lama.

On 23 February 2012, it was reported that Athaiya wished to return her Academy Award to the Academy of Motion Picture Arts and Sciences because she felt that her family will not be able to take care of the trophy after her demise. On 15 December 2012, it was confirmed that the trophy had been returned to The Academy.

In April 2021, as part of the New York Times "Overlooked" series of obituaries that were not written at the time of the person's death (in this case, October 2020), Anita Gates wrote an obituary of Athaiya. In it, Athaiya is quoted about her work on Gandhi:  "Richard Attenborough was making a complex film and needed someone who knew India inside out," Athaiya told Eastern Eye, a British weekly newspaper, in an interview published last year. "So much had to be contributed, and I was ready for it."

Personal life

Bhanu married a lyricist and poet, Satyendra Athaiya, in the 1950s. Subsequently in 1959, she changed her name from Bhanumati to Bhanu Athaiya. Satyendra died in 2004.

In 2012, Bhanu was diagnosed with a brain tumour, which eventually lead to her suffering paralysis on one side of the body and was bed-ridden for the last three years of her life. She died on October 15, 2020, in Mumbai at the age of 91, at a medical centre in South Mumbai. She was survived by her daughter Radhika Gupta.

Awards and nominations

Filmography
Source(s):

See also
List of Indian winners and nominees of the Academy Awards

References

External links

 
 Filmography at The New York Times

1929 births
2020 deaths
20th-century Indian designers
20th-century Indian women artists
21st-century Indian designers
21st-century Indian women artists
Artists from Mumbai
Best Costume Design Academy Award winners
Best Costume Design National Film Award winners
Deaths from brain cancer in India
Indian Academy Award winners
Indian costume designers
Indian illustrators
Indian women fashion designers
People from Kolhapur
Sir Jamsetjee Jeejebhoy School of Art alumni
Women artists from Maharashtra
Women costume designers
Filmfare Lifetime Achievement Award winners